Brendan Gerard Drew (born 16 December 1983) is an Australian cricketer, who played domestic cricket for the Tasmanian Tigers. When not on Tasmanian duty, Drew played Tasmanian club cricket for the Lindisfarne Cricket Club. A tall bowler who generates a lot of pace and bounce, Drew arrived in Tasmania mid-season in 2005 to fill in for a bowling attack struck by injury. He had a solid 2006 season, taking 20 Pura Cup wickets at 31.60 in six matches, and was 12th man in the Tasmania's historic first ever Pura Cup win in 2006–07. Drew later moved to Victoria and played premier cricket for Camberwell, and won the Jack Ryder Medal as Premier Cricket's best player in 2016–17.

References

External links
 

1983 births
Adelaide Strikers cricketers
Australian cricketers
Gloucestershire cricketers
Living people
People from Lismore, New South Wales
Tasmania cricketers
Cricketers from New South Wales